The William R. Thorsen House, often referred to as the Thorsen House, is a historic residence in Berkeley, California. Built in 1909 for William and Caroline Thorsen, it is one of the last of four standing ultimate bungalows designed by Henry and Charles Greene of the renowned architectural firm Greene & Greene and the only one located in Northern California.

Since 1942, it has been home to the Sigma Phi Society of the Thorsen House (alternatively Thorsen or the Sigma Phi Society of California), which hosts communal dinners, organizes small concerts, and offers tours for other students and members of the public, welcoming thousands of visitors a year.

Thorsen can be toured throughout the week on an informal basis; one can simply knock on the door to visit.

History

Namesake 
The Thorsen House is named after William Randolph Thorsen (1860-1942), a lumber baron from Michigan who retired to and purchased a lot in Berkeley, California. His wife, Caroline Canfield Thorsen (1858-1942), was the younger sister of Nellie Canfield Blacker, owner of the Robert R. Blacker House in Pasadena, California. The couple resided in the house following its construction and until their deaths in 1942.

Design 
The house embodies the American Craftsman style of the Arts and Crafts Movement, a style Greene & Greene is  known for incorporating in their projects (as is the case with Gamble House and Blacker House, both in Pasadena).

The entry hall is paneled in Burmese Teak while the living and dining rooms are paneled in Honduras Mahogany with ebony pegs covering the screws. The fireplace in the living room is encased in mauve tile from the Grueby Faience Company. The front door contains leaded art glass in the pattern of a gnarled grape vine, executed by Emil Lange, who also worked on the Gamble House. The Greenes were originally commissioned to make furniture for the dining room, but were later called back to make additional pieces.

See also 
 Greene & Greene
 Gamble House
 Robert R. Blacker House

References

Related reading
Bosley, Edward R.; Robert Judson Clark; Randell L. Makinson   (1996) Last of the Ultimate Bungalows. The William R. Thorsen House of Greene and Greene (University of California)
Makinson, Randall (2001) Greene & Greene: Architecture as a Fine Art (Gibbs Smith) 
Johnson, Robert; Janet Byron (2015) Berkeley Walks: Revealing Rambles through America's Most Intriguing City (Roaring Forties Press)

External links
Official Thorsen House Website  (Sigma Phi Society - Tours) 
Greene and Greene Virtual Archives Website
Berkeley Landmarks Website

Houses completed in 1909
Houses on the National Register of Historic Places in California
History of Alameda County, California
Arts and Crafts architecture in California
Buildings and structures in Berkeley, California
Historic house museums in California
Bungalow architecture in California
American Craftsman architecture in California
Houses in Alameda County, California
Museums in Berkeley, California
Fraternity and sorority houses
National Register of Historic Places in Berkeley, California
Sigma Phi
Greene and Greene buildings